Adam's Tree (Italian: L'albero di Adamo) is a 1936 Italian "white-telephones" comedy film directed by Mario Bonnard and starring Elsa Merlini, Antonio Gandusio and Renato Cialente.

The film's sets were designed by the art director Guido Fiorini.

Cast
 Elsa Merlini as Duchessa Graziella Santori  
 Antonio Gandusio as L'ingegnere Lorenzo Baldi  
 Renato Cialente as Dottore Alfonso Lombardi  
 Dria Paola as Eugenia, sua moglie 
 Olga Vittoria Gentilli as Angelica Pupini  
 Margherita Bagni as Matilde Narchetti  
 Olinto Cristina as Prospero Pupini  
 Calisto Bertramo as Avvocato Giantini  
 Marcello Giorda as Il duca Santori  
 Luigi Mottura as Gaspare  
 Nietta Zocchi as Infermiera Ersilia  
 Nicola Maldacea as Matteo  
 Claudio Ermelli as L'invitato affamato  
 Mario Gallina as Il direttore del giornale 'La Sentinella')  
 Dina Romano as La giornalaia  
 Edda Soligo as Una invitata pettegola  
 Giuseppe Pierozzi as Invitato al ballo  
 Stefano Sibaldi as Invitato al ballo  
 Lina Marengo as Invitata all ballo  
 Alfredo Martinelli as Invitato al ballo  
 Eugenio Fiorentini as Federico  
 Rita Livesi as La cameriera di casa Pupini  
 Mirella Scriatto as La cameriera di Matilde  
 Rosina Adrario

References

Bibliography 
 Goble, Alan. The Complete Index to Literary Sources in Film. Walter de Gruyter, 1999.

External links 
 

1936 films
1930s Italian-language films
Italian comedy films
1936 comedy films
Films directed by Mario Bonnard
Italian black-and-white films
1930s Italian films